Morningwood is the first studio album by the New York City band Morningwood. It was released on Capitol Records in 2006.

The album peaked at #102 on the Billboard 200 and #1 on the Heatseekers album chart.

Several tracks were used on the soundtracks of video games: "Nü Rock" on Burnout Revenge, Burnout Legends and SSX on Tour; "Jetsetter" on Midnight Club 3: DUB Edition Remix; and "Babysitter" on The Sopranos: Road to Respect.

"Nth Degree" was used in the CW television show One Tree Hill (season 3, episode 14), as was and "Body 21" (season 3, episode 5). "New York Girls" was used in the 2008 film adaptation of HBO's Sex and the City.

Critical reception

The album received mixed responses from critics reflected on Metacritic by its normalized score of 55 out of 100 based on 12 reviews. Jonathan Ringen of Rolling Stone called it "a catchier-than-chlamydia mix of power-pop hooks and effects-heavy riffage" but noted that "all the candy-coated excess might leave you feeling a little like Courtney Love after a heavy night". For Allmusic, Johnny Loftus referred to the songs as "sexy catch phrases around rhythms that have been heard before".

Track listing
All songs written by Pedro Yanowitz & Chantal Claret except as noted.
"Nü Rock" (Claret, Timo Ellis) – 2:30
"Televisor" – 3:37
"Nth Degree" (Yanowitz) – 3:55
"Jetsetter"  – 3:54
"Take Off Your Clothes"  – 3:17
"Body 21"  – 3:37
"Easy" (Yanowitz, Claret, Richard Steel, Japa Keenon) – 3:10
"Babysitter"  – 3:31
"New York Girls" (Yanowitz) – 2:56
"Everybody Rules" (Yanowitz, Claret, Ellis) – 3:08
"Ride the Lights" – 4:06
"Knock on Wood" (Eddie Floyd, Steve Cropper) (Japan only bonus track) – 3:53

Personnel
Chantal Claret - vocals
Peter "Pedro" Yanowitz - bass guitar, backing vocalist
Japa Keenon - drums
Richard Steel - guitar

References

2006 debut albums
Morningwood albums
Albums produced by Gil Norton